George Reardon (24 May 1880 – 11 June 1932) was a New Zealand cricketer. He played one first-class match for Otago in 1903/04.

See also
 List of Otago representative cricketers

References

External links
 

1880 births
1932 deaths
New Zealand cricketers
Otago cricketers
Cricketers from Melbourne